Cobb Building may refer to:

 Cobb Building (Wagoner, Oklahoma)
 Cobb Building (Seattle)

See also
Cobbs and Mitchell Building